HMS Hero was a 74-gun third rate of the Royal Navy, launched on 18 August 1803 at Blackwall Yard.

She took part in Admiral Robert Calder's action at the Battle of Cape Finisterre in 1805. Later in the same year Hero was a part of the squadron commanded by Captain Sir Richard Strachan that won the Battle of Cape Ortegal.

On 25 December 1811 Hero, under captain James Newman-Newman, was wrecked on the Haak Sands at the mouth of the Texel during a gale, with the loss of all but 12 of her crew.

Citations

References

 
 Lavery, Brian (2003) The Ship of the Line - Volume 1: The development of the battlefleet 1650-1850. Conway Maritime Press. .
 

Ships of the line of the Royal Navy
Fame-class ships of the line
1803 ships
Ships built by the Blackwall Yard
Maritime incidents in 1811
Shipwrecks in the North Sea